Charles Edward Swain (16 January 1885 – 9 February 1974) was an Australian athlete.  He competed in the 1908 Summer Olympics in London on the Australasia team, a combined squad of competitors from Australia and New Zealand.

Born in Brisbane, Swain participated in the 1500 metres at the 1908 Summer Olympics held in London, he was drawn in a heat with five other runners, but Swain was one of the four athletes who did not finish the race and qualify for the final.

Swain was a member of the Toowong Harriers in Brisbane, and his best race at the National Track and Field events came in the 1909–10 season when he was runner-up in the 880-yard race.

References

 
 
 

1885 births
1974 deaths
Athletes (track and field) at the 1908 Summer Olympics
Olympic athletes of Australasia
Australian male middle-distance runners